Merel Bechtold (born February 27, 1992) is a guitarist from the Netherlands. She was born in Blaricum. She started playing guitar in 2007 at the age of fifteen. Half a year later she founded the band Purest of Pain, in which she played lead guitar until its disbandment in 2018. In 2013, she released the single "Momentum" and in 2014 she starred at the large metal festival Wacken Open Air.

Musical acts 
At the end of 2012, Bechtold performed her first performance with Delain. In 2013, for the first time, she filled in for Timo Somers, Delain's main guitarist. During the same period, she performed several concerts with Purest of Pain. In October 2014, she was contacted by Isaac Delahaye (Epica, ex-MaYaN) who had to leave MaYaN for other priorities. She played with two concerts in January 2015 as a replacement. At the second concert, the band asked her to become a permanent member.

In the summer of 2014, she became part of Anneke van Giersbergen's The Gentle Storm, with van Giersbergen's husband Rob Snijders. She then played several concerts with Delain alongside Somers. In 2015, she again accompanied Delain at other concerts with Sabaton. From October 2015 until June 2019, Bechtold was officially a permanent member of Delain. In 2019 Bechtold formed the alternative/metalcore band Dear Mother, with David Pear and former Delain member Joey de Boer.

Instruments 
Bechtold uses guitars from the Dutch custom guitar shop VanderMeij Guitars, based in Amsterdam. She is mostly seen on stage with her white sevenstring multiscale VanderMeij Magistra. As an amplifier, she uses the ENGL 650, Ritchie Blackmore Signature. For effects use only, Bechtold uses Strymon El Capistan digital tape echo and Octaver Polish Taurus. She uses Ernie Ball strings and Dunlop Jazz plectrums.

References

External links 
 

1992 births
Living people
Dutch rock guitarists
Rhythm guitarists
People from Blaricum
21st-century guitarists
Mayan (band) members
Delain members
21st-century women guitarists